A wormhole  (Einstein-Rosen bridge) is a hypothetical structure connecting disparate points in spacetime, and is based on a special solution of the Einstein field equations.

A wormhole can be visualized as a tunnel with two ends at separate points in spacetime (i.e., different locations, different points in time, or both).

Wormholes are consistent with the general theory of relativity, but whether wormholes actually exist remains to be seen. Many scientists postulate that wormholes are merely projections of a fourth spatial dimension, analogous to how a two-dimensional (2D) being could experience only part of a three-dimensional (3D) object.

Theoretically, a wormhole might connect extremely long distances such as a billion light years, or short distances such as a few meters, or different points in time, or even different universes.

In 1995, Matt Visser suggested  there may be many wormholes in the universe if cosmic strings with negative mass were generated in the early universe. Some physicists, such as Kip Thorne, have suggested how to make wormholes artificially.

Visualization 

For a simplified notion of a wormhole, space can be visualized as a two-dimensional surface. In this case, a wormhole would appear as a hole in that surface, lead into a 3D tube (the inside surface of a cylinder), then re-emerge at another location on the 2D surface with a hole similar to the entrance. An actual wormhole would be analogous to this, but with the spatial dimensions raised by one. For example, instead of circular holes on a 2D plane, the entry and exit points could be visualized as spherical holes in 3D space leading into a four-dimensional  "tube" similar to a spherinder.

Another way to imagine wormholes is to take a sheet of paper and draw two somewhat distant points on one side of the paper. The sheet of paper represents a plane in the spacetime continuum, and the two points represent a distance to be traveled, but theoretically a wormhole could connect these two points by folding that plane (⁠i.e. the paper) so the points are touching. In this way it would be much easier to traverse the distance since the two points are now touching.

Terminology 
In 1928, German mathematician, philosopher and theoretical physicist Hermann Weyl proposed a wormhole hypothesis of matter in connection with mass analysis of electromagnetic field energy; however, he did not use the term "wormhole" (he spoke of "one-dimensional tubes" instead).

American theoretical physicist John Archibald Wheeler (inspired by Weyl's work) coined the term "wormhole" in a 1957 paper co-authored by Charles Misner:

Modern definitions 
Wormholes have been defined both geometrically and topologically. From a topological point of view, an intra-universe wormhole (a wormhole between two points in the same universe) is a compact region of spacetime whose boundary is topologically trivial, but whose interior is not simply connected. Formalizing this idea leads to definitions such as the following, taken from Matt Visser's Lorentzian Wormholes (1996).

Geometrically, wormholes can be described as regions of spacetime that constrain the incremental deformation of closed surfaces. For example, in Enrico Rodrigo's The Physics of Stargates, a wormhole is defined informally as:

Development

Schwarzschild wormholes 
The first type of wormhole solution discovered was the Schwarzschild wormhole, which would be present in the Schwarzschild metric describing an eternal black hole, but it was found that it would collapse too quickly for anything to cross from one end to the other. Wormholes that could be crossed in both directions, known as traversable wormholes, were thought to be possible only if exotic matter with negative energy density could be used to stabilize them. However, physicists later reported that microscopic traversable wormholes may be possible and not require any exotic matter, instead requiring only electrically charged fermionic matter with small enough mass that it cannot collapse into a charged black hole. While such wormholes, if possible, may be limited to transfers of information, humanly traversable wormholes may exist if reality can broadly be described by the Randall–Sundrum model 2, a brane-based theory consistent with string theory.

Einstein–Rosen bridges 
Schwarzschild wormholes, also known as Einstein–Rosen bridges (named after Albert Einstein and Nathan Rosen), are connections between areas of space that can be modeled as vacuum solutions to the Einstein field equations, and that are now understood to be intrinsic parts of the maximally extended version of the Schwarzschild metric describing an eternal black hole with no charge and no rotation. Here, "maximally extended" refers to the idea that the spacetime should not have any "edges": it should be possible to continue this path arbitrarily far into the particle's future or past for any possible trajectory of a free-falling particle (following a geodesic in the spacetime).

In order to satisfy this requirement, it turns out that in addition to the black hole interior region that particles enter when they fall through the event horizon from the outside, there must be a separate white hole interior region that allows us to extrapolate the trajectories of particles that an outside observer sees rising up away from the event horizon. And just as there are two separate interior regions of the maximally extended spacetime, there are also two separate exterior regions, sometimes called two different "universes", with the second universe allowing us to extrapolate some possible particle trajectories in the two interior regions. This means that the interior black hole region can contain a mix of particles that fell in from either universe (and thus an observer who fell in from one universe might be able to see light that fell in from the other one), and likewise particles from the interior white hole region can escape into either universe. All four regions can be seen in a spacetime diagram that uses Kruskal–Szekeres coordinates.

In this spacetime, it is possible to come up with coordinate systems such that if a hypersurface of constant time (a set of points that all have the same time coordinate, such that every point on the surface has a space-like separation, giving what is called a 'space-like surface') is picked and an "embedding diagram" drawn depicting the curvature of space at that time, the embedding diagram will look like a tube connecting the two exterior regions, known as an "Einstein–Rosen bridge". The Schwarzschild metric describes an idealized black hole that exists eternally from the perspective of external observers; a more realistic black hole that forms at some particular time from a collapsing star would require a different metric. When the infalling stellar matter is added to a diagram of a black hole's geography, it removes the part of the diagram corresponding to the white hole interior region, along with the part of the diagram corresponding to the other universe.

The Einstein–Rosen bridge was discovered by Ludwig Flamm in 1916, a few months after Schwarzschild published his solution, and was rediscovered by Albert Einstein and his colleague Nathan Rosen, who published their result in 1935. However, in 1962, John Archibald Wheeler and Robert W. Fuller published a paper showing that this type of wormhole is unstable if it connects two parts of the same universe, and that it will pinch off too quickly for light (or any particle moving slower than light) that falls in from one exterior region to make it to the other exterior region.

According to general relativity, the gravitational collapse of a sufficiently compact mass forms a singular Schwarzschild black hole. In the Einstein–Cartan–Sciama–Kibble theory of gravity, however, it forms a regular Einstein–Rosen bridge. This theory extends general relativity by removing a constraint of the symmetry of the affine connection and regarding its antisymmetric part, the torsion tensor, as a dynamic variable. Torsion naturally accounts for the quantum-mechanical, intrinsic angular momentum (spin) of matter. The minimal coupling between torsion and Dirac spinors generates a repulsive spin–spin interaction that is significant in fermionic matter at extremely high densities. Such an interaction prevents the formation of a gravitational singularity. Instead, the collapsing matter reaches an enormous but finite density and rebounds, forming the other side of the bridge.

Although Schwarzschild wormholes are not traversable in both directions, their existence inspired Kip Thorne to imagine traversable wormholes created by holding the "throat" of a Schwarzschild wormhole open with exotic matter (material that has negative mass/energy).}

Other non-traversable wormholes include Lorentzian wormholes (first proposed by John Archibald Wheeler in 1957), wormholes creating a spacetime foam in a general relativistic spacetime manifold depicted by a Lorentzian manifold, and Euclidean wormholes (named after Euclidean manifold, a structure of Riemannian manifold).

Traversable wormholes 
The Casimir effect shows that quantum field theory allows the energy density in certain regions of space to be negative relative to the ordinary matter vacuum energy, and it has been shown theoretically that quantum field theory allows states where energy can be arbitrarily negative at a given point. Many physicists, such as Stephen Hawking, Kip Thorne, and others, argued that such effects might make it possible to stabilize a traversable wormhole.The only known natural process that is theoretically predicted to form a wormhole in the context of general relativity and quantum mechanics was put forth by Leonard Susskind in his ER = EPR conjecture. The quantum foam hypothesis is sometimes used to suggest that tiny wormholes might appear and disappear spontaneously at the Planck scale, and stable versions of such wormholes have been suggested as dark matter candidates. It has also been proposed that, if a tiny wormhole held open by a negative mass cosmic string had appeared around the time of the Big Bang, it could have been inflated to macroscopic size by cosmic inflation.

Lorentzian traversable wormholes would allow travel in both directions from one part of the universe to another part of that same universe very quickly or would allow travel from one universe to another. The possibility of traversable wormholes in general relativity was first demonstrated in a 1973 paper by Homer Ellis and independently in a 1973 paper by K. A. Bronnikov. Ellis analyzed the topology and the geodesics of the Ellis drainhole, showing it to be geodesically complete, horizonless, singularity-free, and fully traversable in both directions. The drainhole is a solution manifold of Einstein's field equations for a vacuum spacetime, modified by inclusion of a scalar field minimally coupled to the Ricci tensor with antiorthodox polarity (negative instead of positive). (Ellis specifically rejected referring to the scalar field as 'exotic' because of the antiorthodox coupling, finding arguments for doing so unpersuasive.) When  is set equal to 0, the drainhole's gravitational field vanishes. What is left is the Ellis wormhole, a nongravitating, purely geometric, traversable wormhole.

Kip Thorne and his graduate student Mike Morris independently discovered in 1988 the Ellis wormhole and argued for its use as a tool for teaching general relativity. For this reason, the type of traversable wormhole they proposed, held open by a spherical shell of exotic matter, is also known as a Morris–Thorne wormhole.

Later, other types of traversable wormholes were discovered as allowable solutions to the equations of general relativity, including a variety analyzed in a 1989 paper by Matt Visser, in which a path through the wormhole can be made where the traversing path does not pass through a region of exotic matter. However, in the pure Gauss–Bonnet gravity (a modification to general relativity involving extra spatial dimensions which is sometimes studied in the context of brane cosmology) exotic matter is not needed in order for wormholes to exist—they can exist even with no matter. A type held open by negative mass cosmic strings was put forth by Visser in collaboration with Cramer et al., in which it was proposed that such wormholes could have been naturally created in the early universe.

Wormholes connect two points in spacetime, which means that they would in principle allow travel in time, as well as in space. In 1988, Morris, Thorne and Yurtsever worked out how to convert a wormhole traversing space into one traversing time by accelerating one of its two mouths. However, according to general relativity, it would not be possible to use a wormhole to travel back to a time earlier than when the wormhole was first converted into a time "machine". Until this time it could not have been noticed or have been used.

Raychaudhuri's theorem and exotic matter 
To see why exotic matter is required, consider an incoming light front traveling along geodesics, which then crosses the wormhole and re-expands on the other side. The expansion goes from negative to positive. As the wormhole neck is of finite size, we would not expect caustics to develop, at least within the vicinity of the neck. According to the optical Raychaudhuri's theorem, this requires a violation of the averaged null energy condition. Quantum effects such as the Casimir effect cannot violate the averaged null energy condition in any neighborhood of space with zero curvature, but calculations in semiclassical gravity suggest that quantum effects may be able to violate this condition in curved spacetime. Although it was hoped recently that quantum effects could not violate an achronal version of the averaged null energy condition, violations have nevertheless been found, so it remains an open possibility that quantum effects might be used to support a wormhole.

Modified general relativity 
In some hypotheses where general relativity is modified, it is possible to have a wormhole that does not collapse without having to resort to exotic matter. For example, this is possible with R gravity, a form of  gravity.

Faster-than-light travel 

The impossibility of faster-than-light relative speed applies only locally. Wormholes might allow effective superluminal (faster-than-light) travel by ensuring that the speed of light is not exceeded locally at any time. While traveling through a wormhole, subluminal (slower-than-light) speeds are used. If two points are connected by a wormhole whose length is shorter than the distance between them outside the wormhole, the time taken to traverse it could be less than the time it would take a light beam to make the journey if it took a path through the space outside the wormhole. However, a light beam traveling through the same wormhole would beat the traveler.

Time travel 

If traversable wormholes exist, they might allow time travel. A proposed time-travel machine using a traversable wormhole might hypothetically work in the following way: One end of the wormhole is accelerated to some significant fraction of the speed of light, perhaps with some advanced propulsion system, and then brought back to the point of origin. Alternatively, another way is to take one entrance of the wormhole and move it to within the gravitational field of an object that has higher gravity than the other entrance, and then return it to a position near the other entrance. For both these methods, time dilation causes the end of the wormhole that has been moved to have aged less, or become "younger", than the stationary end as seen by an external observer; however, time connects differently through the wormhole than outside it, so that synchronized clocks at either end of the wormhole will always remain synchronized as seen by an observer passing through the wormhole, no matter how the two ends move around. This means that an observer entering the "younger" end would exit the "older" end at a time when it was the same age as the "younger" end, effectively going back in time as seen by an observer from the outside. One significant limitation of such a time machine is that it is only possible to go as far back in time as the initial creation of the machine; it is more of a path through time rather than it is a device that itself moves through time, and it would not allow the technology itself to be moved backward in time.

According to current theories on the nature of wormholes, construction of a traversable wormhole would require the existence of a substance with negative energy, often referred to as "exotic matter". More technically, the wormhole spacetime requires a distribution of energy that violates various energy conditions, such as the null energy condition along with the weak, strong, and dominant energy conditions. However, it is known that quantum effects can lead to small measurable violations of the null energy condition, and many physicists believe that the required negative energy may actually be possible due to the Casimir effect in quantum physics. Although early calculations suggested a very large amount of negative energy would be required, later calculations showed that the amount of negative energy can be made arbitrarily small.

In 1993, Matt Visser argued that the two mouths of a wormhole with such an induced clock difference could not be brought together without inducing quantum field and gravitational effects that would either make the wormhole collapse or the two mouths repel each other, or otherwise prevent information from passing through the wormhole. Because of this, the two mouths could not be brought close enough for causality violation to take place. However, in a 1997 paper, Visser hypothesized that a complex "Roman ring" (named after Tom Roman) configuration of an N number of wormholes arranged in a symmetric polygon could still act as a time machine, although he concludes that this is more likely a flaw in classical quantum gravity theory rather than proof that causality violation is possible.

Interuniversal travel 

A possible resolution to the paradoxes resulting from wormhole-enabled time travel rests on the many-worlds interpretation of quantum mechanics.

In 1991 David Deutsch showed that quantum theory is fully consistent (in the sense that the so-called density matrix can be made free of discontinuities) in spacetimes with closed timelike curves. However, later it was shown that such a model of closed timelike curves can have internal inconsistencies as it will lead to strange phenomena like distinguishing non-orthogonal quantum states and distinguishing proper and improper mixture. Accordingly, the destructive positive feedback loop of virtual particles circulating through a wormhole time machine, a result indicated by semi-classical calculations, is averted. A particle returning from the future does not return to its universe of origination but to a parallel universe. This suggests that a wormhole time machine with an exceedingly short time jump is a theoretical bridge between contemporaneous parallel universes.

Because a wormhole time-machine introduces a type of nonlinearity into quantum theory, this sort of communication between parallel universes is consistent with Joseph Polchinski's proposal of an Everett phone (named after Hugh Everett) in Steven Weinberg's formulation of nonlinear quantum mechanics.

The possibility of communication between parallel universes has been dubbed interuniversal travel.

Wormhole can also be depicted in Penrose diagram of Schwarzschild black hole. In the Penrose diagram, an object traveling faster than light will cross the black hole and will emerge from another end into a different space, time or universe. This will be an interuniversal wormhole.

Metrics 
Theories of wormhole metrics describe the spacetime geometry of a wormhole and serve as theoretical models for time travel. An example of a (traversable) wormhole metric is the following:

first presented by Ellis (see Ellis wormhole) as a special case of the Ellis drainhole.

One type of non-traversable wormhole metric is the Schwarzschild solution (see the first diagram):

The original Einstein–Rosen bridge was described in an article published in July 1935.

For the Schwarzschild spherically symmetric static solution 

If one replaces  with  according to 

For the combined field, gravity and electricity, Einstein and Rosen derived the following Schwarzschild static spherically symmetric solution

where  is the electric charge.

The field equations without denominators in the case when  can be written

In order to eliminate singularities, if one replaces  by  according to the equation:

and with  one obtains

In fiction 

Wormholes are a common element in science fiction because they allow interstellar, intergalactic, and sometimes even interuniversal travel within human lifetime scales. In fiction, wormholes have also served as a method for time travel.

See also 

 Alcubierre drive
 ER=EPR
 Gödel metric
 Krasnikov tube
 Non-orientable wormhole
 Self-consistency principle
 Polchinski's paradox
 Retrocausality
 Ring singularity
 Roman ring

Notes

References

Citations

Sources 

 
 
 
 
 
 
 
 
 
 
 
 
 
 
 
 
 
  An excellent and more concise review.

External links 

 "What exactly is a 'wormhole'? Have wormholes been proven to exist or are they still theoretical??" answered by Richard F. Holman, William A. Hiscock and Matt Visser
 "Why wormholes?" by Matt Visser (October 1996)
 
 Questions and Answers about Wormholes—A comprehensive wormhole FAQ by Enrico Rodrigo
 Large Hadron ColliderTheory on how the collider could create a small wormhole, possibly allowing time travel into the past
 animation that simulates traversing a wormhole
 Renderings and animations of a Morris-Thorne wormhole
 NASA's current theory on wormhole creation

Albert Einstein
Astronomical hypotheses
Black holes
Conjectures
Connection (mathematics)
Exotic matter
Faster-than-light travel
General relativity
Gravity
Hypothetical astronomical objects
Lorentzian manifolds
Space
Theory of relativity
Time travel